Lamberton may refer to:

People
William de Lamberton (died 1328), 13th century bishop
Judge Robert Lamberton (1809–1885), Venango County Judge and founder of the Lamberton Savings Bank, Franklin, Pa.
Benjamin P. Lamberton (1844–1912), admiral
Charles Lamberton (1876–1960), fl. 1912–1956, French zoologist
Jaap Lamberton, Dutch comics artist
Robert Eneas Lamberton (1886–1941), politician
 Donald Lamberton (1927–2014), Australian economist
 Ken Lamberton (born 1958), American writer and former teacher
Thierry Lamberton (born 1966), French ice speed skater
 Robert D. Lamberton, classics scholar, poet, and translator of ancient and contemporary literature
George Lamberton (1880–1954), English footballer
James Lamberton (1877–1929), English footballer

Places

United Kingdom 
 Lamberton, Berwickshire, Scotland
 Lambroughton in North Ayrshire, Scotland (alternative spelling of Lamberton)

United States 
 Lamberton, Minnesota
 Lamberton Township, Redwood County, Minnesota
 Lamberton, New Jersey
Lamberton, West Virginia
 Lamberton Lake, Michigan